Huling is a town in Rui'an, China. Huling possesses  of arable land.

General Information 
Most of the territory is hilly and mountainous with river valleys and plains in the middle rich in agricultural resources. The town is directly connected to Ouhai by Hufang Highway through Fangzhuang Township, and the planned Quhu Highway leads to Ouhai via Linxi Township to the east, and Rui (An) Feng (Ling) Highway runs east–west through the town. The town mainly produces rice and wheat, but also produces handicrafts, clothing, toilet paper and beef.

History

20th Century
The town was established in 1931 and renamed as a commune in 1958. 1984, the town of Lake Township in 1992, merged with the Hangyuan Township for the restoration of Lake Town.

References 

Cities in Zhejiang